The Whites is a 2015 detective novel written by Richard Price under the pen name Harry Brandt. The book was published on February 17, 2015.  Scott Rudin is producing a film adaptation of the novel.

Critical reception
The New York Times called The Whites "a work of reportage as much as it is a work of fiction. That’s what makes it important. It tells it like it is. It provides insight and knowledge, both rare qualities in the killing fields of the crime novel."

References

2015 American novels
Novels by Richard Price (writer)
English-language books
American detective novels
Henry Holt and Company books